Mark Shanks (born 19 May 1959 in Airdrie) is a Scottish former association football player and manager. Shanks played for Motherwell, Ayr United, Dumbarton and Dumfries club Queen of the South.

After retirement, Shanks managed Albion Rovers, Queen of the South and then managed Junior club [[Kilwinning Rangers

External links 
 

1959 births
Living people
Association football defenders
Scottish footballers
Scottish Football League players
Motherwell F.C. players
Ayr United F.C. players
Dumbarton F.C. players
Queen of the South F.C. players
Scottish football managers
Albion Rovers F.C. managers
Ayr United F.C. managers
Scottish Football League managers
Scottish Junior Football Association managers
Kilwinning Rangers F.C. managers